The Chinese Ambassador to Austria is the official representative of the People's Republic of China to Austria.

List of representatives

See also
China–Austria relations

References 

Ambassadors of China to Austria
Austria
China